Lavenachiton is an extinct genus of polyplacophoran mollusc of uncertain taxonomic placement.

References

Prehistoric chiton genera